Jonathan Wrather (born 16 March 1969) is an English actor. He is known for his soap opera roles in Coronation Street as Joe Carter from 2002 until 2003, and in Emmerdale as Pierce Harris from 2016 until 2017, making a guest appearance in 2020.

Career
Wrather has made guest appearances in several television series, including Cracker, Clocking Off, Bob And Rose, Fat Friends, The Fugitives, Bones, Waterloo Road, Silent Witness, Jo, and Casualty. 
From 2002 to 2003, he was a series regular in the ITV soap opera Coronation Street, portraying the role of Joe Carter for 107 episodes. In 2016, it was confirmed that Wrather would portray the role of Pierce Harris in the ITV soap opera Emmerdale. His character was introduced as the husband of Tess Harris (Nicola Stephenson). Wrather reprised his role as Pierce in January 2020.

Filmography

References

External links
 

20th-century English male actors
21st-century English male actors
Male actors from Manchester
Alumni of RADA
English male soap opera actors
Living people
1969 births